Endless or The Endless may refer to:

Business
 Endless (private equity), a British firm
 Endless.com, an e-commerce website selling shoes and accessories
 Endless Computers, an American operating system company

Film
 The Endless (film), a 2017 American film
 Endless (2020 film), an American film

Music

Albums
 Endless (Frank Ocean album), 2016
 Endless (The McClymonts album) or the title song, 2017
 Endless (EP) or the title song, by Unearth, 2002
 Endless, by Red Flag, 2019

Songs
 "Endless" (Inna song), 2011
 "Endless" (Sakanaction song), 2011
 "Endless" (VAX song), 2018
 "Endless", by Cory Asbury from Reckless Love, 2018
 "Endless", by Dickie Valentine, 1954
 "Endless", by the McGuire Sisters, 1956
 "Endless", by Toto from Isolation, 1984

Other uses
 Endless (artist), British graffiti and street artist
 Endless (comics) or The Endless, a fictional group of characters in the comic book series The Sandman
 Endless Mountains, Pennsylvania, US
 Endless mode, a special challenge mode in some video games; See Glossary of video game terms

See also
 
 Eternity, a limitless amount of time
 Infinity, a mathematical, philosophical and theological concept of endlessness
 Forever (disambiguation)
 Unlimited (disambiguation)